Idiot is a 1992 Hindi film based on Fyodor Dostoevsky's 1869 novel, The Idiot. It was directed by Mani Kaul and starred Shah Rukh Khan and Ayub Khan-Din. The film debuted at the New York Film Festival in October 1992. In this version of the tale, placed in contemporary Mumbai, Prince Miskin (Khan-Din) is a man whose epilepsy is mistaken for idiocy.

Cast
 Shahrukh Khan
 Ayub Khan Din as Prince Miskin
 Imam Khan
 Mita Vashisht

Production and release
The film was first released as a four-part television mini-series on state-run Doordarshan channel in 1991, and despite it outing at debuted at the New York Film Festival in October 1992, it was never commercially released.
It was screened at the Mumbai Film Festival in October 2016 with the title "Ahamaq".

Reception
According to the New York Times, "it turns a literary masterpiece into a numbing soap opera as incoherent as it is technically crude."

Awards 
 1993 Filmfare Awards: Critics Award For Best Movie

References

External links 

 
 

1992 films
Films directed by Mani Kaul
Films based on The Idiot
1990s Hindi-language films
Films set in Mumbai
Doordarshan television films